= Cost Recovery Corporation =

Cost Recovery Corporation (CRC), based in Dayton, Ohio, is committed to assisting municipalities in their efforts to recoup the costs expended by their Safety Services Departments at "crashes".

The company gained notoriety after the publication of an article in The New York Times on April 11, 2009, that mentioned its role in Winter Haven, Florida's institution of an Accident Response Fee.
